Bardonecchia railway station serves the town and comune of Bardonecchia, in the Piedmont region, northwestern Italy. The station is a through station of the Turin-Modane railway. The train services are operated by Trenitalia and SNCF.

Since 2012 it serves line SFM3, part of the Turin metropolitan railway service.

Train services
The station is served by the following services:

High speed services (TGV) Paris - Chambéry - Turin - Milan
Turin Metropolitan services (SFM3) Bardonnechia - Bussoleno - Turin

References

Railway stations in the Metropolitan City of Turin
Railway stations opened in 1871